The St Croix Pietenpol Aerial is an American homebuilt aircraft that was designed by Chad and Charles Willie and produced by St Croix Aircraft of Corning, Iowa, first flown in 1977. When it was available the aircraft was supplied in the form of plans for amateur construction, with partial kits available.

Design and development
The Pietenpol Aerial was conceived as a biplane adaptation of the Pietenpol Air Camper parasol wing homebuilt design. The design work was completed in 1974 and the first example flown in 1977, with the plans as supplemental drawings to the Aircamper plans. The resulting aircraft features a biplane layout, two separate tandem open cockpits with individual windshields, fixed conventional landing gear and a single engine in tractor configuration.

The aircraft is made from a combination of wood and welded steel tubing, all covered in doped aircraft fabric. The lower wing is removable, allowing the aircraft to fly as an Aircamper parasol monoplane.

The designers estimated the construction time from the supplied plans as 1200 hours.

Flight testing showed that the aircraft has shorter take-off and landing distances that the standard Aircamper, a lower stall speed and better stability in turbulence.

Operational history
By 1998 the company reported that 400 sets of plans had been sold.

In February 2014 one example was registered in the United States with the Federal Aviation Administration.

Specifications (Pietenpol Aerial)

References

Aerial
1970s United States sport aircraft
1970s United States civil utility aircraft
Single-engined tractor aircraft
Biplanes
Homebuilt aircraft
Aircraft first flown in 1977